Yenning Amadi Likla (English: Spring And Dew) is a 2007 Indian Meitei language film directed by Makhonmani Mongsaba and produced by SURVI (Santibala, Sunitibala, Umabati, Saroja, Victoria and Ibemhal), under the banner of Nongin Films. It stars Muru Ningthoujam, Huirem Seema, Lairenjam Olen and Reshmi Samom in the lead roles. The story of the film was written by Moirangthem Inao. The film was made in 16 mm and blown up in 35 mm. It was processed at Prasad Laboratory, Chennai.

Yenning Amadi Likla got entry into the feature film section of the Indian Panorama of the 39th International Film Festival of India (IFFI) 2008. It was among 21 selected feature films. The movie also got selection at 2nd Hyderabad International Film Festival 2008.

It was also screened at the 2nd edition of Doordarshan Best of Indian Cinema Film Festival 2014.

Synopsis
The movie tells the story of a nature loving child Sanatomba who is neglected by his parents. His mother Leibaklei goes to a nearby rice mill daily to work. Sanatomba's father Ibohal is an alcoholic who literally does nothing but routinely picks up fight with his wife. He does not believe in the idea of education shaping a child's future. These particular notion of Ibohal has serious consequences on Sanatomba's schooling and childhood.

The child's future becomes more blurry when Leibaklei left for her maternal home. Thambal is a neighbour and classmate of Sanatomba. Her parents etch out a plan for Sanatomba's welfare.

Cast
 Muru Ningthoujam as Sanatomba
 Reshmi Samom as Thambal
 Lairenjam Olen as Ibohal, Sanatomba's Father
 Huirem Seema as Leibaklei, Sanatomba's Mother
 Samjetsabam Mangoljao as Ibotombi, Thambal's Father
 Daisy Kh. as Ibeyaima, Thambal's Mother
 Hamom Sadananda as Bijaya's husband
 Lilabati Chanam as Bijaya
 Lourembam Pishak (Abok Pishak) as Sanatomba's maternal grandmother
 Shougrakpam Hemanta as School Headmaster
 Chinglen Thiyam as Hotel Owner
 Rajkumar Jnaranjan (Guest Appearance)

Soundtrack
Sagolsem Tijendra composed the soundtrack for the movie. Narendra Ningomba, Makhonmani Mongsaba and Moirangthem Inao wrote the lyrics. Suniti, Iraileima and Reshmi performed the chorus music. The title of the film is sung by Satyaditya as a short song.

External links

References

Meitei-language films
2007 films